The 1991–92 European Cup group stage began on 27 November 1991 and ended on 15 April 1992. A total of eight teams competed in the group stage to decide the two finalists of the 1991–92 European Cup. This was the first use of a group stage in the history of the competition.

Draw
The draw for the group stage was held on 8 November 1991 in Geneva, Switzerland. The eight teams that advanced from the second round were drawn into two groups of four.

Format
In each group, teams played against each other home-and-away in a double round-robin format. The winner of each group then faced each other in the final.

Groups
Times are CET/CEST, as listed by UEFA.

Group A

Group B

Notes

References

External links

Group stage
1991-92
November 1991 sports events in Europe
December 1991 sports events in Europe
March 1992 sports events in Europe
April 1992 sports events in Europe